The 2015–16 FC Anzhi Makhachkala season was the club's first season back in the Russian Premier League, the highest tier of football in Russia, since their relegation at the end of the  2013–14 season. Anzhi will also take part in the Russian Cup, entering at the Round of 32 stage.

Season events
On 18 June 2015, Yuri Semin was announced as the club's new manager, signing a one-year contract with the option of an additional year. On 29 September, Semin left Anzhi Makhachkala by Mutual consent, and Ruslan Agalarov was appointed as caretaker manager.

Squad
1

On loan

Youth squad

Transfers

Summer

In:

Out:

Winter

In:

Out:

Friendlies

Competitions

Russian Premier League

Results by round

Matches

League table

Relegation play-offs

Russian Cup

Squad statistics

Appearances and goals

|-
|colspan="14"|Players away from the club on loan:|-
|colspan="14"|Players who appeared for Anzhi Makhachkala no longer at the club:''

|}

Goal scorers

Disciplinary record

Notes
As Russia does not recognize Kosovo as an independent state, Berisha is registered with the Russian league as an Albanian citizen.

References

External links
Official website
Fans' website 
A fan is a club Anji

FC Anzhi Makhachkala seasons
Anzhi Makhachkala